Jelm Mountain is located in the Albany County in the U.S. state of Wyoming.

The nearest settlement is Woods Landing-Jelm.  Its summit is the site of the Wyoming Infrared Observatory.

Access
An unpaved road, which originally served as a fire access road, leads from the southwestern bottom of the mountain to the summit.

Athletic competitions
The Jelm Mountain Race, during which runners ascend and descend the mountain, is held every year.

See also

List of mountain peaks of North America
List of mountain peaks of the United States

References

Mountains of Wyoming
Mountains of Albany County, Wyoming